Hasmukh Adhia, IAS (born 3November 1958) is an Indian Banker and a civil servant. He is one of the key persons behind the architecture and roll-out of the Goods and Services Tax & Demonetization scheme announced in 2016. He is an Indian Administrative Service (IAS) officer of the 1981Gujarat cadre batch who served as Finance Secretary and Revenue Secretary of State. He previously served in several capacities for the Indian and Gujarat governments, including as Financial Services Secretary. He is the present Non-Executive Chairman of Bank of Baroda.
A week after the government nominated him chairman of state-owned Bank of Baroda, he was appointed as the Chancellor of Central University of Gujarat.

Education 
Hasmukh Adhia is a Doctor of Philosophy (PhD) in yoga from the Swami Vivekanand Yoga University in Bangalore, and is a gold medallist in oneyear post graduate programme in public management and Policy for Government and Non Government Executives (PGP-PMP) from Indian Institute of Management Bangalore. His thesis for PhD was on "Impact of Yoga on Management". He also has Master of Commerce and Bachelor Commerce degrees from Gujarat University.

Career
Adhia has served in various positions for both the Government of Gujarat and the Government of India, like as Additional chief secretary (Finance), Principal Secretary (Education), Principal Secretary (Transport), Principal Secretary to Chief Minister of Gujarat, executive director of the Sardar Sarovar Narmada Nigam, managing director of the Gujarat Industrial Investment Corporation, and as the district magistrate and collector of Bhavnagar and Surat districts in the Gujarat government; and as Union Revenue Secretary and Union Financial Services Secretary, in the Indian government.

Adhia was also a consultant to the United Nations Industrial Development Organization.

Financial Services Secretary 
Adhia was appointed as the Union Financial Services Secretary by the prime minister-headed Appointments Committee of the Cabinet (ACC) in November 2014, he assumed office on 3November, and demitted it on 31August 2015, when he was appointed the Union Revenue Secretary.

Revenue Secretary 

Adhia was appointed as the Union Revenue Secretary by the ACC in August 2015, he assumed office on 1September 2015.

In September 2017, after the retirement of Ashok Lavasa, Adhia was designated as the Finance Secretary, as he became the senior-most secretary in the Ministry of Finance. Adhia retired from IAS and simultaneously demitted the offices of Finance Secretary and Revenue Secretary on 30November 2018; he was succeeded as Revenue Secretary by Unique Identification Authority of India's chief executive officer Ajay Bhushan Pandey, and as Finance Secretary by Expenditure Secretary Ajay Narayan Jha, as the senior-most secretary in the Ministry of Finance.

Ahead of his retirement, Adhia was praised by Minister of Finance Arun Jaitley, who called him "highly competent, disciplined, no-nonsense civil servant [...] with impeccable integrity," and said that Adhia refused important post-retirement assignment from the government and instead intended to focus on spirituality and caring for his son.

During his tenure as Revenue Secretary, Adhia was regarded as one of the most powerful bureaucrats in India.

Controversies 
Adhia is considered one of the key persons behind the architecture and roll-out of the controversial Goods and Service Tax in India. He is also considered to be privy to another major controversial move of demonetisation of Rs500 and Rs.1000 Currency notes which forced the retirement of 86percent of cash in circulation in India on 8November 2016.

He was also accused of diluting graft charges against congress leader like Sonia Gandhi, P.Chidambaram. Hasmukh Adhia was accused of interfering and preventing promotion of Enforcement Directorate Joint Director Rajeshwar Singh. BJP Leader Subramaniam Swamy filed a petition in Supreme Court in favour of Rajeshwar Singh.

Hasmukh Adhia was considered to be one of the key persons in bringing controversial LTCG tax for Stocks without any indexation benefits. This move was considered to be illogical and became largely unpopular in Indian Stock Market. This triggered Foreign Inverstors to pull out investment from Indian Stock Market and triggered a Market Crash on 2 February 2018, a day after the announcement was made.

Hasmukh Adhia along with Indian Finance minister Arun Jaitley became highly unpopular after piling up taxes and cess on Indian Salaried Class instead of raising the tax slab. There was an outrage among salaried class when he was quoted saying "Why shouldn’t we tax a class that is investing in markets".

Books

References

External links 

Executive record sheet as maintained by the Department of Personnel and Training in the Ministry of Personnel, Public Grievances and Pensions of the Government of India

Indian Administrative Service officers
Gujarat University alumni
Indian Institute of Management Bangalore alumni
1958 births
Living people
People from Rajkot district